Kenneth Christopher "Skip" McClendon (born April 9, 1964) is a former professional American football player who played defensive end for seven seasons for the Cincinnati Bengals, the San Diego Chargers, the Minnesota Vikings, and the Indianapolis Colts.

1964 births
Living people
Players of American football from Detroit
American football defensive ends
Butler Grizzlies football players
Arizona State Sun Devils football players
Cincinnati Bengals players
San Diego Chargers players
Minnesota Vikings players
Indianapolis Colts players